The Dong Son culture or the Lạc Việt culture (named for modern village Đông Sơn, a village in Thanh Hóa, Vietnam) was a Bronze Age culture in ancient Vietnam centred at the Red River Valley of northern Vietnam from 1000 BC until the first century AD. Vietnamese historians attribute the culture to the states of Văn Lang and Âu Lạc. Its influence spread to other parts of Southeast Asia, including Maritime Southeast Asia, from about 1000 BC to 1 BC.

The Dong Son people were skilled at cultivating rice, keeping water buffalos and pigs, fishing and sailing in long dugout canoes. They also were skilled bronze casters, which is evidenced by the Dong Son drum found widely throughout northern Vietnam and South China.

To the south of the Dong Son culture was the Sa Huỳnh culture of the proto-Chams.

Identity
People of the Dong Son culture spoke either Austroasiatic or Northern Tai languages; or were Austroasiatic-speakers with significant contact and admixture with Tai-speakers.

Archaeogenetics have demonstrated that before the Dong Son period, the Red River Delta's inhabitants were predominantly Austroasiatic. Genetic data from Vietnam's Phùng Nguyên culture's Mán Bạc burial site demonstrated close proximity to modern Austroasiatic speakers such as the Khmer and Mlabri; meanwhile, "mixed genetics" from Đông Sơn culture's Núi Nấp site showed affinity to "Dai from China, Tai-Kadai speakers from Thailand, and Austroasiatic speakers from Vietnam, including the Việt". 

Ferlus (2009) showed that the inventions of pestle, oar, and a pan to cook sticky rice, which is the main characteristic of the Đông Sơn culture, correspond to the creation of new lexicons for these inventions in Northern Vietic (Việt–Mường) and Central Vietic (Cuoi-Toum). The new vocabularies to denote these inventions were proven to be derivatives from original verbs rather than borrowed lexical items. The current distribution of Northern Vietic also correspond to the area of Dong Son culture. Thus, Ferlus conclude that the Dongsonian culture was of Vietic origin and they were the direct ancestors of modern Vietnamese people.

Origins

The origins of Dong Son culture may be traced back to ancient bronze castings. Scholars traditionally traced the origins of bronze-casting technology to China but during the 1970s archaeological discoveries in Isan, Thailand found that the casting of bronze either began in Southeast Asia first then spread into China, or that it developed the practise independently from China. The Dong Son bronze industry therefore has a local origin in Southeast Asia rather than being introduced by migrations out of China. The Gò Mun culture gave rise to the Dong Son culture; the Dong Son was the culmination of the Bronze Age and the opening stage of the Iron Age.

The bronze drums were used for war, "the chief summons the warriors of the tribe by beating the drum", when mourning, and during feasts.  "The scenes cast onto the drums would inform us that the Dong Son leaders had access to bronze founders of remarkable skill." Lost-wax casting was based on Chinese founders, but the scenes are local, including drummers and other musicians, warriors, rice processing, birds, deer, war vessels, and geometric designs.

The bronze drums were made in significant proportions in northern Vietnam, Laos and parts of Yunnan. The Dong Son bronze drums exhibit "remarkable skill".

Displays of the Đông Sơn drum surface can be seen in some of Vietnam's cultural institutions.

See also

 Lạc Việt
 Dong Son drum
 Austronesia
 Nanyue
 Âu Lạc
 Baiyue

References

External links
 Đông Sơn culture (photo collection)
 Drums from Selayar (photo collection) 

 
Ancient Vietnam
Prehistoric Thailand
Archaeological cultures of Southeast Asia
Archaeological cultures in Vietnam
Bronze Age cultures of Asia
1st millennium BC in Vietnam